The Estonian Top Division 1942 was the 21st football league season in Estonia. First round started on 19 July and ended on 6 September. Second round started on 22 September and ended on 11 October. Tartu Prefektuuri Spordiring won the title.

League table

Results

References

Estonian Football Championship
Football